Bharat Institutions is a group of educational and technical institutions at Hyderabad, Telangana started by the Chinta Reddy Madhusudhan Reddy Educational Society established in the year 1991.

Group of institutions 
 Bharat Institute of Engineering and Technology (2001)
 Bharat Institute of Technology and Science for Women (2008)
 Bharat Institute of Technology – Pharmacy (1999)
 Bharat Degree College for Women (1991)
 Bharat Post Graduate College for Women (1997)
 Bharat College of Education
 Bharat Post Graduate College

References 

Education in Telangana
1991 establishments in Andhra Pradesh
Educational institutions established in 1991